Amaury Silva (born 6 March 1942) is a Brazilian footballer. He played in two matches for the Brazil national football team in 1963. He was also part of Brazil's squad for the 1963 South American Championship.

References

1942 births
Living people
Brazilian footballers
Brazil international footballers
Place of birth missing (living people)
Association football forwards
Esporte Clube São Bento players
Guarani FC players
CR Flamengo footballers
FC Porto players
Santos FC players
Esporte Clube XV de Novembro (Piracicaba) players
Bangu Atlético Clube players
Esporte Clube Noroeste players
Atlas F.C. footballers
Brazilian expatriate footballers
Expatriate footballers in Portugal
Expatriate footballers in Mexico